Ocuviri District is one of ten districts of the province Lampa in Peru.

Geography 
Some of the highest mountains of the district are listed below:

Ethnic groups 
The people in the district are mainly indigenous citizens of Quechua descent. Quechua is the language that the majority of the population (78.38%) learn to speak in childhood. 19.35% of the residents first learn to speak using the Spanish language (2007 Peru Census).

References